Jimmy Ines (born 15 July 1994) is a Cape Verdean footballer.

Club career

In June 2013 Jimmy signed his first professional contract, agreeing to a four-year deal. He spent the next season loaned to União da Madeira.

He made his Primeira Liga debut on 28 September 2014, appearing as a late substitute in a 1-0 away win against Arouca.

On 2 February 2015, Jimmy moved to Santa Clara on a six-month loan. Just six days later, Jimmy made his debut in a 1-1 home draw with S.C. Farense. On 19 April, he scored his first ever professional goal in a 2-0 home win against Académico Viseu.

References

External links
Soccerway profile

1994 births
Living people
Portuguese people of Cape Verdean descent
Cape Verdean footballers
Footballers from Santiago, Cape Verde
Primeira Liga players
Liga Portugal 2 players
Cape Verde international footballers
Cape Verdean expatriate footballers
Expatriate footballers in Portugal
Associação Académica de Coimbra – O.A.F. players
C.F. União players
C.D. Santa Clara players
Sportspeople from Praia
Association football midfielders